Waylain Edwin September (born 20 September 1984) is a South African cricketer who played for Boland between 2003 and 2009. A right-handed batsman and left-arm orthodox spin bowler, he made his first-class debut on 2 April 2004 against Eastern Province.

References
Waylain September profile at CricketArchive

1984 births
Living people
Cricketers from Paarl
South African cricketers
Boland cricketers